Sylvain Mizrahi (February 14, 1951 – January 13, 2021), known professionally as Sylvain Sylvain, was an American rock guitarist, most notable for being a member of the New York Dolls.

Early years
Sylvain was born in Cairo, Egypt, to a Jewish family, but his family fled in the 1950s, first to France and finally to New York, United States. The Mizrahis lived first on Lafayette Avenue in Buffalo, New York, but later moved to the New York City neighborhood of Rego Park, Queens, while he was still a child.  Sylvain had dyslexia. He attended Newtown High School in Queens and Quintano's School for Young Professionals in Manhattan.

Prior to joining the New York Dolls, Sylvain and future New York Doll bandmate Billy Murcia ran a clothing company called "Truth and Soul," which helped define his fashion sense and would play a role in the band's groundbreaking look. He had one brother, Leon (deceased), and one sister, Brigitte.

Career

Before joining the New York Dolls in 1971, Sylvain was a member of the band Actress, which also featured Arthur Kane, Johnny Thunders and former fashion partner, Billy Murcia. He played rhythm guitar for the Dolls from 1971 until the group's final dissolution in 1977. Sylvain and singer David Johansen were the last remaining members at the time the group broke up. After the dissolution of the Dolls, he frequently played with Johansen on some of his solo records. He started his own band, The Criminals, with another ex-Doll, Tony Machine, and continued to play the New York club scene. He landed a solo recording contract with RCA, and released one album with Lee Crystal (drums; later of Joan Jett's Blackhearts) and Johnny Ráo (guitar).

He moved to Los Angeles in the early 1990s and recorded one record, Sleep Baby Doll for Fishhead Records. His band mates on this record were: Brian Keats, drums, John Carlucci, bass, and Olivier LeBaron' on lead guitar, with guest appearances by Frank Infante of Blondie and Derwood Andrews of Generation X. In the late 90s he teamed up with the LA punk band The Streetwalkin' Cheetahs for some touring and they recorded a live radio broadcast on KXLU that remains unreleased. The tour ended with an Atlanta show at the Navarre annual conference co-headlining with John Entwistle. In 2004 he reunited with the surviving members of the New York Dolls, along with Steve Conte, Brian Koonin and Brian Delaney. Arthur Kane, who died in 2004, was replaced by Sami Yaffa. They released three records: One Day It Will Please Us To Remember Even This, Cause I Sez So, and Dancing Backward in High Heels. The reunion was filmed as part of a documentary on former band member Kane that was released in 2005 as New York Doll.

On March 18, 2010, at the South by Southwest music festival in Austin, Texas, Sylvain and Cheetah Chrome of The Dead Boys and Rocket from the Tombs debuted their new band, The Batusis.  Their EP is on Smog Veil Records.

In November 2012, Sylvain posted a video for his new single, "Leaving New York," on the Internet, and available on iTunes on December 2, 2012.

In 2013 and 2014 Sylvain joined with Glen Matlock as the Sex Doll Tour.

In 2015, Sylvain emerged with a new band called Sylvain Sylvain and the Sylvains from Austin, Texas, consisting of Chris Alaniz (drums), Jason "Ginchy" Kottwitz (guitar), and Gabriel Von Asher (bass). In March 2016, they performed at South by Southwest.

In 2018, Sylvain joined forces with Steve Conte, Sami Yaffa, and Robert Eriksson for two one-off dates in Tokyo as "The Dolls." They played at Shinjuku Marz on February 11, and Shimokitazawa Garden on February 12.

Personal life
After living in Atlanta for several years, Sylvain moved to Nashville in 2015.
On April 27, 2019, Sylvain announced that he had cancer. He set up a GoFundMe page to raise money to help pay for treatment. He died from cancer at his home on January 13, 2021, at age 69.

Discography

With New York Dolls
New York Dolls (1973, Mercury Records)
Too Much Too Soon (1974, Mercury Records)
One Day It Will Please Us to Remember Even This (2006, Roadrunner Records)
Cause I Sez So (2009, Atco Records)
Tokyo Dolls Live (credited to 'David and Sylvain') – a live album by the Dolls line-up of Johansen and Sylvain with Peter Jordan/Chris Robison/Tony Machine. French Fan Club/New Rose.
New York Dolls Red Patent Leather – live album of McLaren-era Dolls allegedly produced by Sylvain, with original manager Marty Thau credited as Executive Producer
Dancing Backward in High Heels (2011, 429 Records)

As Sylvain Sylvain
Sylvain Sylvain (1979, RCA Records)
Sleep Baby Doll (1998, Fishhead Records)
Leaving New York single (2012, self-released)

With Syl Sylvain and the Teardrops 
Syl Sylvain and the Teardrops (1981, RCA Records)

With Sylvain Sylvain and The Criminal$ 
78 Criminals (1985, Fan Club)
Bowery Butterflies (2000, Munster Records)

With She Wolves 
Sheena Is a Punk Rocker single (2007, Poptown Records)

With the Batusis 
Batusis EP (2010, Smog Veil Records)

With Roman Sandals 
This Is It Single (1984, Body Rock)

As producer 
River City Rebels, Hate To Be Loved album (2004, Victory Records)

References

Bibliography
 Lazell, Barry. Punk! An A-Z, Hamlyn, 1995
 Ruppli, Michel; Novitsky, Ed. The Mercury Labels. A Discography, Vol. V., Record and Artist Indexes, Greenwood Press, 1993.

External links

 [ Sylvain Sylvain] on Allmusic
 
 
2010 Syl Sylvain interview on RocknRollDating
 Radio Interview on Jekyll and Hyde

1951 births
2021 deaths
20th-century American guitarists
21st-century American guitarists
American people of Egyptian-Jewish descent
American punk rock guitarists
Deaths from cancer in Tennessee
Egyptian Jews
Egyptian emigrants to the United States
Glam rock musicians
Jewish American musicians
Jews in punk rock
American Mizrahi Jews
Musicians from Buffalo, New York
Musicians from Cairo
Musicians from Queens, New York
New York Dolls members
People from Rego Park, Queens
Rhythm guitarists
21st-century American Jews